The 1983–84 UCLA Bruins men's basketball team represented the University of California, Los Angeles in the 1983–84 NCAA Division I men's basketball season.  The Bruins started the season ranked 9th in the nation (AP Poll). On January 28, the Bruins hosted #2 Depaul, losing 68-84. UCLA beat the #13 (AP Poll) Washington Huskies 73-59, on March 1 for their biggest win of the season. UCLA's team finished 4th in the Pac-10 and was unranked in the final AP and coaches polls. This was Larry Farmer's third and final year as head coach of the UCLA Bruins. The team did not qualify for the NCAA Division I Men's Basketball Championship, and declined an invitation to the National Invitation Tournament.

Starting lineup

Roster

Schedule

|-
!colspan=9 style=|Regular Season

Source

References

UCLA Bruins men's basketball seasons
Ucla
NCAA
NCAA